SS W. S. Jennings was a Liberty ship built in the United States during World War II. She was named after W. S. Jennings, an American politician. He served as the 18th Governor of Florida after being a lawyer, county judge, and state representative.

Construction
W. S. Jennings was laid down on 9 June 1944, under a Maritime Commission (MARCOM) contract, MC hull 2487, by the St. Johns River Shipbuilding Company, Jacksonville, Florida; and was launched on 25 July 1944.

History
She was allocated to the Stockard Steamship Corp., on 9 August 1944. On 15 December 1949, she was laid up in the National Defense Reserve Fleet, Mobile, Alabama. On 28 April 1952, she was laid up in the James River Reserve Fleet, Lee Hall, Virginia. On 1 July 1953, she was withdrawn from the fleet to be loaded with grain under the "Grain Program 1953", she returned loaded on 17 July 1953. On 17 June 1957, she was withdrawn to be unload, she returned on empty 27 June 1957. On 30 June 1958, she was withdrawn from the fleet to be loaded with grain under the "Grain Program 1958", she returned loaded on 8 July 1958. On 17 December 1959, she was withdrawn to be unload, she returned on empty 30 December 1959. On 17 July 1961, she was withdrawn from the fleet to be loaded with grain under the "Grain Program 1961", she returned loaded on 31 July 1961. On 17 January 1964, she was withdrawn to be unload, she returned on empty 30 January 1964. She was sold for scrapping, 27 February 1970, to S.P.A. Cantieri Navali, for $117,625. She was removed from the fleet, 1 May 1970.

References

Bibliography

 
 
 
 

 

Liberty ships
Ships built in Jacksonville, Florida
1944 ships
Mobile Reserve Fleet
James River Reserve Fleet
James River Reserve Fleet Grain Program